"This Little Light of Mine" is a popular traditional gospel song of unknown origin. It was often reported to be written for children in the 1920s by Harry Dixon Loes, but he never claimed credit for the original version of the song, and researchers at the Moody Bible Institute, where Loes worked, said they have found no evidence that he wrote it.  It was later adapted by Zilphia Horton, amongst many other activists, in connection with the civil rights movement.

History 
The origin of the song is unclear, but the phrase "This little light of mine" appears published in poetry by 1925 by Edward G. Ivins, a writer in Montana. In 1931, the song is mentioned in a Los Angeles newspaper as "Deaconess Anderson's song". In 1932, the song was mentioned in a 1932 Missouri newspaper.  In 1933, the song was mentioned in newspapers as being sung  by a chorus at an African Methodist Episcopal conference in Helena, Montana and then various other churches around the United States later that year. In June 1934 John Lomax and Alan Lomax recorded the earliest known recording of the song when they recorded Jim Boyd of Jacksonville, Texas singing at the State Penitentiary in Huntsville, Texas. In 1939 Lomax returned to Texas with Ruby Lomax during their Southern States Recording Trip and recorded the song again. This song and others were sung by a black woman, Doris McMurray who was imprisoned at Thomas Goree Unit in Texas and said that she learned the song from her grandmother in Waco. She sang the following lyrics, taught to her by her grandmother:
 This little light o’ mine, I'm goin’ let it shine
 Let it shine, let it shine, let it shine.
 Evrywhere I go, I'm goin’ let it shine (repeat)
 Let it shine, let it shine, let it shine.
 In my neighbor's home, I'm goin’ let it shine  (repeat)
 Let it shine, let it shine, let it shine.

Many other verses have been added over the years, including impromptu lines appropriate to the occasion. The song is sung around the world, with the simple lyrics and tune resonating with all ages. Harry Dixon Loes, who studied at the Moody Bible Institute and the American Conservatory of Music, was a musical composer and teacher, who wrote or co-wrote several other gospel songs. He wrote a popular adaptation of the song "This Little Light of Mine" in the 1940s, but never copyrighted or claimed credit for writing the original, which remains of unknown origin.

Often thought of as an African-American spiritual, it can be found in The United Methodist Hymnal, #585, adapted by William Farley Smith in 1987, and in the Unitarian Universalist Hymn Book, Singing the Living Tradition, #118, with harmonies by Horace Clarence Boyer.  The song does not appear in any of the major nineteenth-century collections of African American songs.

While the song is most widely recognized as an African American spiritual, over the years it has been transformed into a song of resistance adopted by Cvil Rights Movements. With such joyful and hopeful lyrics, "This Little Light of Mine" brought unification and strength to social movements, allowing oppressed groups to reinforce their shared identity and communicate their demands for equity. Freedom Singing, a congressional style of singing that often uses church hymns as a form of resistance in social protests, was quite common especially during the Civil Right Movement in the 1960's. Rutha Mae Harris, one of the four original freedom singers from Georgia, said the song "helped steady protestors' nerves as abusive police officers threatened to beat them or worse." Singing this exuberant, spiritual song also helped to deescalate the tension and agitation during the protests.

Themes
Some claim the song takes its theme from some of Jesus's remarks to his followers. Matthew 5:14-16 of the King James Version gives: "Ye are the light of the world. A city that is set on an hill cannot be hid. Neither do men light a candle and put it under a bushel, but on a candlestick; and it giveth light unto all that are in the house. Let your light shine before men, that they may see your good works and give glory to your Father who is in heaven." The parallel passage in Luke 11:33 of the King James Version gives: "No man, when he hath lighted a candle, putteth it in a secret place, neither under a bushel, but on a candlestick, that they which come in may see the light."

Given that the source is unknown and God and Jesus are not mentioned in the words, it is equally possible that the song reflects a global longing to be seen as a good person trying to make the world a better place.

Versions

The song was sung by Sister Rosetta Tharpe as early as 1960. The song has also been secularised into "This Little Girl of Mine" as recorded by Ray Charles in 1956 and later The Everly Brothers. It has often been published with a set of hand movements to be used for the instruction of children.

Under the influence of Zilphia Horton, Fannie Lou Hamer, and others, it eventually became a Civil Rights anthem in the 1950s and 1960s, especially the version by Bettie Mae Fikes. The Kingston Trio recorded it on College Concert in 1962, and The Seekers for their second UK album, Hide & Seekers (also known as The Four & Only Seekers) in 1964. Sam Cooke released his version on the 1964 live album Sam Cooke at the Copa. Over time it also became a very popular children's song, recorded and performed by the likes of Raffi in the 1980s from his album Rise and Shine. It is sometimes included in Christian children's song books.

Odetta and the Boys Choir of Harlem performed the song on the Late Show with David Letterman on September 17, 2001, on the first show after Letterman resumed broadcasting, after having been off the air for several nights following the events of 9/11. Reverend Osagyefo Sekou and other counter-protesters sang "This Little Light of Mine" defiantly before a crowd of white supremacists and alt-right supporters gathered for the Unite the Right rally in Charlottesville, VA in 2018.

The song featured on Hoyt Axton's 1963 album Thunder 'N Lightnin' named "This Little Light". LZ7 took their version of the song also named "This Little Light" to number 26 in the UK Singles Chart. The song is also sung in several scenes of the 1994 film Corrina, Corrina starring Whoopi Goldberg and Ray Liotta.

The song was mixed with You Can't Be A Beacon by The Masters V (Later: J.D. Sumner and the Stamps) in 1988.

The song was sampled throughout the titular song to the 2012 DCOM, Let it Shine.

Meghan Markle and Prince Harry chose to end their wedding in May 2018 with a version of the iconic song.

See also
 Civil rights movement in popular culture

References

External links 
 Spiritual lyrics 
 Top 10 Civil Rights songs
 
 This Little Light of Mine for choir. 
 recording by Derek Lee Ragin of "This Little Light of Mine"
 "This Little Light of Mine" Doris McMurray, Goree Farm, Huntsville, TX: John and Ruby Lomax 1939 Southern States Recording Trip.

Gospel songs
American Christian hymns
English children's songs
Year of song unknown
Carola Häggkvist songs
Sam Cooke songs
The Kingston Trio songs
African-American spiritual songs
Songs of the civil rights movement